Khoksa is an upazila of Kushtia District in the Division of Khulna, Bangladesh.

Geography
It has a total area of 99.17 km2.

Demographics

According to the 2011 Bangladesh census, Khoksa Upazila had 32,110 households and a population of 129,555, 17.1% of whom lived in urban areas. 9.8% of the population was under the age of 5. The literacy rate (age 7 and over) was 44.7%, compared to the national average of 51.8%.

Administration
Khoksa Upazila is divided into Khoksa Municipality and nine union parishads: Ambaria, Betbaria, Gopagram, Janipur, Jayanti, Khoksa, Osmanpur, Samaspur, and Shimulia. The union parishads are subdivided into 82 mauzas and 103 villages.

Khoksa Municipality is subdivided into 9 wards and 18 mahallas.

Education 
 
Khoksa has a number of educational institutions some colleges as well within them Khokha Government College, Kushtia and is the most renowned and old which is the first college of khoksha and dream child of Mr. Dijendranath Biswas and Rabindranath Biswas and respectively they are the English and Bengali backbone of Khoksa Kushtia and international speaker as well.. Khoksa-Janipur Pilot High Schoolare mentionable. 
These educational institutions have a glorious history and reputation. 
Besides there are Shomospur High School, Khoksa Janipur Pilot Girls High School, Iswardi High School, Bongram High School, Moragacha High School etc.

Religion

Historical Kalibari Temple in Khoksa

References

Upazilas of Kushtia District
Kushtia District
Khulna Division